Phuritad Jarikanon(born August 1, 1989) is a Thai footballer. He last played for Thai League 2 clubside Muangkan United.

Honours

Club
 Kor Royal Cup 2009 Winner with Chonburi FC
 Thai FA Cup 2013 Runner-Up with Bangkok Glass
 Thai League Cup 2019 Winner with PT Prachuap F.C.

External links

https://int.soccerway.com/players/phuritad-jarikanon/73369/

References

1989 births
Living people
Phuritad Jarikanon
Phuritad Jarikanon
Phuritad Jarikanon
Phuritad Jarikanon
Phuritad Jarikanon
Phuritad Jarikanon
Phuritad Jarikanon
Phuritad Jarikanon
Phuritad Jarikanon
Phuritad Jarikanon
Phuritad Jarikanon
Association football midfielders
Footballers at the 2010 Asian Games
Phuritad Jarikanon
Phuritad Jarikanon
Phuritad Jarikanon